ʿAbd ar-Rabb Jaunpūrī (1875 – June 1935) was an Indian Muslim scholar, author and teacher. He was associated with Taiyuni reformist movement, founded by his grandfather Karamat Ali Jaunpuri, and succeeded his uncle Hafiz Ahmad Jaunpuri as the leader of the movement in 1899.

Early life and education 
Abdul Rab Jaunpuri was born in 1875 to a scholarly Indian Muslim family in Mullatola, Jaunpur, located in the North-Western Provinces of the British Raj. His father, Hafiz Mahmud Jaunpuri, traced his ancestry to the Arab tribe of Quraysh, with Jaunpuri being a 37th-generation direct descendant of Abu Bakr, the first Rashidun caliph. Jaunpuri's grandfather Karamat Ali Jaunpuri was the founder of the Taiyuni reformist movement and propagated Islam in north India and Bengal. His great grandfather, Abu Ibrahim Shaykh Muhammad Imam Bakhsh ibn Shaykh Jarullah was a student of Shah Abdul Aziz Dehlavi. Many of his family members were also Islamic scholars, for example, his uncles Hafiz Ahmad Jaunpuri and Abdul Awwal Jaunpuri, and his cousin Rashid Ahmed Jaunpuri.

Jaunpuri's father died when he was five years old, so he was brought up and educated by his uncle Hafiz Ahmad Jaunpuri. He memorised the Qur'an in his childhood, and studied the Arabic and Persian languages. He was said to have mastered the knowledge of ma'rifa.

Career 
Jaunpuri worked alongside his uncle in establishing numerous religious institutions in Daulatkhan in the Bengali island of Bhola. He established a langar khana which provided meals to needy people in the area. Jaunpuri toured many different parts of Bengal, giving public lectures, where he gained a large following. Notable locations include Sandwip and Barisal. He also wrote books in Urdu such as Nafeul Khalaiq. Many of the next generation of Islamic scholars were his murids such as Muhammad Ishaq and Abul Hasanat Muhammad Abdul Hayy.

Death 
Jaunpuri died in June 1935 in his home neighbourhood of Mullatola in Jaunpur, then located under the United Provinces of British India.

Spiritual genealogy 
His spiritual genealogy is as follows:
 Prophet Muhammad
 Abū Bakr
 Salmān al-Fārisī
 Al-Qāsim bin Muḥammad bin Abī Bakr 
 Jaʿfar bin Muḥammad bin ʿAlī aṣ-Ṣādiq
 Abū Yazīd Ṭayfūr al-Bisṭāmī
 Abu al-Ḥasan ʿAlī al-Kharaqānī
 Abū ʿAlī Faḍl bin Muḥammad bin ʿAlī al-Fārmadī
 Abū Yaʿqūb Yūsuf al-Hamadānī
 ʿAbd al-Khāliq al-Ghijdawānī
 Khwājah Muḥammad ʿĀrif al-Riwgarī
 Khwājah Maḥmūd al-Anjīr al-Faghnawī
 ʿAzīzān ʿAlī ar-Rāmitānī
 Sayyid Shams ad-Dīn Amīr Kulāl
 Muḥammad Bābā as-Samāsī
 Sayyid Bahā ad-Dīn Naqshband
 Sayyid Mīr ʿAlā ad-Dīn ʿAṭṭār
 Yaʿqūb Charkhī
 Khwājah ʿUbaydullāh Aḥrār
 Khwājah Muḥammad Zāhid Wakhshī
 Khwājah Darwesh Muḥammad
 Khwājah Muḥammad Amkingī
 Khwājah Raḍī ad-Dīn Muḥammad Bāqī Billāh
 Aḥmad al-Fārūqī as-Sirhindī
 Sayyid Ādam bin Nūrī
 Sayyid ʿAbdullāh Akbarābādī
 Shāh ʿAbd ar-Raḥīm Dehlawī
 Shāh Walīullāh Dehlawī
 Shāh ʿAbd al-ʿAzīz Dehlawī
 Sayyid Aḥmad Shahīd
 Karāmat ʿAlī bin Abī Ibrāhīm Muḥammad Imām Bakhsh bin Jār Allāh al-Jaunpūrī
 Ḥāfiẓ Aḥmad bin ʿAlī al-Jaunpūrī
 ʿAbd ar-Rabb bin Maḥmud bin ʿAlī al-Jaunpūrī

References 

Indian Muslim scholars of Islam
1875 births
1935 deaths
Indian revolutionaries
19th-century Indian Muslims
19th-century Indian educators
19th-century Muslim theologians
20th-century Indian Muslims
20th-century Indian educators
20th-century Muslim theologians
People from Jaunpur district
Sunni Muslim scholars of Islam
Hanafis